Alan Leslie "Skip" Teal (July 17, 1933 – July 8, 2006) was a professional ice hockey centre who played in one National Hockey League game for the Boston Bruins during the 1954–55 season, on December 12, 1954 against the Montreal Canadiens. The rest of his career, which lasted from 1953 to 1963, was spent in the minor leagues. He is the older brother of Vic Teal, who also played in only one NHL game.

Career statistics

Regular season and playoffs

See also
List of players who played only one game in the NHL

External links

1933 births
2006 deaths
Barrie Flyers players
Boston Bruins players
Canadian expatriate ice hockey players in the United States
Canadian ice hockey centres
Clinton Comets players
Hershey Bears players
Ice hockey people from Ontario
Kingston Frontenacs (EPHL) players
Quebec Aces (QSHL) players
St. Catharines Teepees players
Springfield Indians players
Sportspeople from Fort Erie, Ontario
Victoria Cougars (1949–1961) players